Robertas is a Lithuanian masculine given name. It is the Lithuanian form of Robert and may refer to:

Robertas Javtokas (b. 1980), Lithuanian basketball player for Žalgiris Kaunas
Robertas Kuncaitis (b. 1964), Lithuanian basketball coach
Robertas Poškus (b. 1979), Lithuanian footballer 
Robertas Žulpa (b. 1960), Lithuanian swimmer who competed for the USSR

See also
 Robert

Lithuanian masculine given names